Pacificanthia consors is a species of soldier beetle in the family Cantharidae. It is found in North America, mainly in California. Adults are 14-19 mm in length. They are orange with brown wing covers, and the legs are reddish with black markings.

References

Further reading

 
 

Cantharidae
Articles created by Qbugbot
Beetles described in 1851